Qualification for diving at the 2020 Summer Olympics allocated a total of 136 quota spots, evenly divided between men and women.  Each nation may enter not more than 16 divers (up to eight males and eight females) with up to two in each individual event and a pair in each synchronized event. Athletes must be 14 years of age by the end of 2020 to compete.

Timeline

Qualification summary
For individual diving, the top twelve from the 2019 World Championships, the five continental champions and the eighteen semifinalists at the 2020 Diving World Cup will achieve a quota spot. For the pairs events, the top three from the world championships, the top four from the world cup and the hosts qualify. Additional quota places go to the next best finishers in the World Cup until the maximum number of divers (68 athletes per gender) is reached.

Synchronized diving

Men's 3 m synchronized springboard

Men's 10 m synchronized platform

Women's 3 m synchronized springboard

Women's 10 m synchronized platform

Individual diving

Men's 3 m springboard
For the individual events, one diver can only gain a single quota place per event for their NOC.

Men's 10 m platform
For the individual events, one diver can only gain a single quota place per event for their NOC.

Women's 3 m springboard
For the individual events, one diver can only gain a single quota place per event for their NOC.

Women's 10 m platform
For the individual events, one diver can only gain a single quota place per event for their NOC.

References

Qualification for the 2020 Summer Olympics
2019 in diving
2020 in diving
Qualification